Addicted, also known as Heroin, is a 2016 streaming television series based on the boys' love novel Are You Addicted? (你丫上瘾了) by Chai Jidan. The series is about two sixteen-year-old boys, Gu Hai and Bai Luo Yin, who despite their social differences and personal history forge a close love relationship. Starring Huang Jingyu and Xu Weizhou in their television debut, it premiered on January 29, 2016, and aired for three episodes weekly until February 23, 2016 when it was banned by Chinese authorities. The series' groundbreaking success and its subsequent ban brought the attention to the taboo topic of homosexuality in mainland China. The series has since developed a cult following.

Production
Filming of the drama began on November 30, 2015 in Beijing, China and ended on December 23, 2015. Featuring a first-time director and new actors, the drama had a production budget of only 5 million yuan (around US$741,300). Due to the low-budget, the cast did their own make-up most of the time and supplied some of their own clothes for the filming.

Prior to Addicted, boys' love dramas were understood to belong in a very specific genre with a very specific audience base, hence the series wasn't expected to reach mainstream success.

Synopsis
Ever since he was young, Bai Luo Yin (Xu Weizhou) has been living with his careless but loving father, Bai Han Qi, and his sick grandmother. When he turned 16 years old, his biological mother Jiang Yuan remarried. Her new husband is a high-ranking military official, Gu Wei Ting.

Because of his mother's death, Gu Wei Ting's son, Gu Hai (Huang Jingyu), has been harboring a deep grudge towards his father. By the random hand of fate, the two step-brothers with wildly conflicting emotional backgrounds were placed in the same class at a Beijing high school, without knowing each other's background at first. With time, they slowly developed a special feeling toward one another. Their classmates, You Qi and Yang Meng, had been instrumental in the relationship.

At times, over the course of the series some friends mention that an abbreviated combination of the boys names Hai and Luo Yin sound like “Heroin”.

Cast

Episodes

Soundtrack

Reception

Audience viewership
On January 29, 2016, the series' first episode premiered on Tencent Video, iQiyi, and other video sites and garnered 10 million views in the span of 24 hours after its initial online release, setting the record of the highest number of views on the first day in China's streaming television history. In less than a month, the series reached over 100 million views, and it became the second most-watched show on iQiyi and the most-watched show on other video sites.

Social media

The series became a viral topic on Weibo and other social platforms. The word 上瘾 (Shàngyǐn) was mentioned more than 3.9 million times on Weibo in the week of 21 – 27 February 2016, and the hashtag #上阴网络剧# (Shàngyǐn web drama) has been viewed over 840 million times. A Weibo user wrote about how the series was a phenomenal success:
"You have no idea how crazy it was. [...] The whole of weibo was talking about it. Everyone was watching it; everyone was talking about it." 

The four main actors, particularly Huang and Xu, achieved overnight stardom. Their on-screen chemistry and off-screen interactions in backstage clips gained them a large number of fans who "shipped" them as a real life romantic couple.

Censorship
Despite the groundbreaking success, on February 23, 2016, all episodes of the drama were abruptly removed from all Chinese video streaming websites (three episodes before the season finale) by the order of SAPPRFT (now NRTA) due to "the gay and explicit content" and are no longer accessible to Chinese viewers, much to the series viewers outrage. The last three episodes of the first season were uploaded a few days later to the official YouTube channel of Huace Film & TV, accessible to viewers outside of mainland China.

Reaction

The censorship of the series sparked criticisms, questions, and discussions about the taboo topic of homosexuality and the acceptance of LGBT community in authoritarian mainland China. Online discussions on Weibo with the hashtag "removal of Addiction" received more than 110 million views within a day of its cancellation. American news media The Wall Street Journal and Time also published articles about the censorship.

Matthew Baren of Shanghai Pride told Time that while its “disappointing” that Addiction has gone offline, “it’s very encouraging to see shows about homosexuality being made in China, by Chinese talents and for Chinese audiences.” A Weibo user was quoted by the South China Morning Post: “Why did they take away this drama? [...] There are millions of reasons to cover their move, but the truth is that they are afraid of gay [issues]." Chinese activist Li Maizi argued regarding the series' censorship: "The recent hit gay-themed Web dramas show that the LGBT market is broad. [...] SAPPRFT had better face up to it rather than implementing unspoken rules or using traditional values as a shield."

Banning of Huang and Xu
Despite the series' cancellation, the two main actors continued to skyrocket in popularity both individually and as a screen couple, doing interviews and magazine photoshoots together, and also continued to publicly interacting and "teasing" each other on Weibo to fans' delight.

However on April 17, 2016, it was revealed that its planned second season was permanently shelved, and China has unofficially banned the two actors from appearing on television or any event together. Their filmed appearances on Chinese television variety shows such as Happy Camp, Run for Time, and Avenue of Stars subsequently never aired. On April 17, 2016, during a fan meeting in Thailand, in a brief moment when they did come together, they were quickly pulled apart by security guards. It was their last public appearance together. There was no official announcement to the banning of the actors (contrary to the previous official announcement ordering the series to immediately be pulled off-air) to the puzzlement and disappointment of fans. Xu stopped receiving work offers for a period of time as a repercussion of the ban.

Legacy
, the series' episodes on Huace Film & TV YouTube channel has a total of 28 million views. The series remains to be the most popular boys' love series ever made from mainland China.

The series developed an active cult following in boys' love genre fandom and casual fans since its cancellation, both locally and internationally. As of October 2020, the Weibo forum for fans of the series (especially fans of Huang and Xu as a couple) known as 双超 (shuangchao) has over 360,000 followers, most of them still being active.

The term "eight-year promise" is used by the series' fans to wait for the day Huang and Xu are "able to share the stage together, to be photographed together, once more." The fans chose eight years because the couple is separated for eight years in the original novel.

Future
On June 21, 2019, Jidan posted pictures on Weibo and responded to user's questions by saying that filming for season two has started in Taiwan. It is rumored that the cast has been changed.

References

External links
 Addicted Web Series' Official Weibo
Addicted Playlist on China Huace Film & TV Official Channel on YouTube

2016 Chinese television series debuts
2016 Chinese television series endings
Chinese romance television series
Chinese-language television shows
Censored television series
Chinese web series
Television shows based on Chinese novels
Television series by Huace Media
IQIYI original programming
2016 web series debuts
Television censorship in China
Works banned in China
Chinese boys' love television series
Chinese LGBT-related web series